The name Brendan has been used for two tropical cyclones in the northwest Pacific Ocean.

 Tropical Storm Brendan (1991) (T9108, 08W, Helming), struck the Philippines and China
 Tropical Storm Brendan (1994) (T9411, 14W, Oyang), struck South Korea and Japan

Pacific typhoon set index articles